Roberto Bianchi is the name of:

Roberto Bianchi Montero (1907–1986), Italian actor
Roberto Bianchi Pelliser (born 1966), Brazilian football player and coach
Roberto Bianchi (character), fictional character in the Eternal Darkness video game